The Koonyum Range is a mountain range located in the Australia state of New South Wales.

The name Koonyum is probably derived from the Gidabal term "gunyin" for anus.

References

Mountain ranges of New South Wales